Soni is a Khatri clan originating from the Punjab region of India.

Guru Govind Singh married his second wife, Sundari, a Soni khatri of Bajwara at Makhowal on 15 May 1685.

References

Khatri clans